Tibor Varga may refer to:

Tibor Varga (ice hockey) (born 1985), Slovak ice hockey player 
Tibor Varga (violinist) (1921–2003), Hungarian violinist and conductor